Pittoconcha concinna is a species of air-breathing land snail or semislug, a terrestrial pulmonate gastropod mollusk in the family Helicarionidae. This species is endemic to Norfolk Island.

References

Gastropods of Norfolk Island
Pittoconcha
Vulnerable fauna of Australia
Gastropods described in 1913
Taxonomy articles created by Polbot